Gaspare Serenario (Palermo, Sicily 1707–1759)  was an Italian painter, active mainly in a grand late Baroque style.

Biography
As a youth, he moved to Rome, where he lived for over thirty years. Along with the fellow Sicilian Olivio Sozzi, Serenario trained under Sebastiano Conca, then the pre-eminent studio in Rome. Serenario was named knight of the Order of the Congregazione Pontificia dei Virtuosi al Pantheon. He returns to Palermo where he completes the cycle of decorations for the church of Santa Rosalia and completes frescos for Palazzo Mazzarino. He was nominated director of the mosaics of the Cappella Palatina.

He painted an altarpiece depicting the Crucifixion with Mary, St John, and Mary Magdalen (1748) for a chapel of the church of Santa Chiara all'Albergaria.

References

1707 births
1759 deaths
Painters from Palermo
18th-century Italian painters
Italian male painters
Pontifical Academy of Fine Arts and Letters of the Virtuosi al Pantheon